Sédhiou (Wolof: Seéju) is a town of Senegal, in Casamance area, nearby the Casamance river, with a population of 24,213 in 2013. It is the capital of the Sédhiou Region.

History
The main historical culture of Sédhiou came from the Mandinka people, but many populations are located in the area nowadays.

Geography

It is the capital of the Sédhiou Region.

Demographics
In 1983, 13,212 inhabitants lived in the town, rising to 18,465 in 2002. At the 2013 census Sédhiou had a population of 24,213.

Notable people
Sadio Mané (born 1992), professional footballer who plays for Bundesliga club FC Bayern Munich and the Senegal national team.

Twin town
Les Ulis

References

External links
  City web site
 Présentation of Sédhiou on Les Ulis official web site

Populated places in Sédhiou Region
Regional capitals in Senegal
Casamance
Communes of Senegal